Antonio Rebollo Liñán (born 19 June 1955, in Madrid, Spain) is a Spanish Paralympic archer. During the Opening Ceremony of the 1992 Summer Olympics in Barcelona, he lit the Olympic Cauldron by shooting a flaming arrow over it, igniting the gases.

Life and career
When Rebollo was eight months old, he contracted polio with both legs affected, the right one severely. He competed in archery, representing Spain at the 1984, 1988, and 1992 Summer Paralympics. He won a silver in 1984, bronze in 1988, and a second silver in 1992.

The opening ceremony of the 1992 Barcelona Olympics featured the Olympic Flame being ignited from afar by a flaming arrow. Rebollo was one of 200 archers considered for the position of firing the arrow. There were sunrise practices, along with wind machines to simulate various weather conditions, and flaming arrows that would often singe fingers. He was among four finalists, and was chosen two hours before the event.

References

External links
 

1955 births
Living people
Spanish male archers
Paralympic archers of Spain
Archers at the 1984 Summer Paralympics
Archers at the 1988 Summer Paralympics
Archers at the 1992 Summer Paralympics
Paralympic silver medalists for Spain
Paralympic bronze medalists for Spain
Medalists at the 1984 Summer Paralympics
Medalists at the 1988 Summer Paralympics
Medalists at the 1992 Summer Paralympics
Olympic cauldron lighters
Paralympic medalists in archery
20th-century Spanish people